The play-offs of the 2015 Fed Cup Europe/Africa Zone Group I were the final stages of the Group I zonal competition involving teams from Europe and Africa. Using the positions determined in their pools, the fifteen teams faced off to determine their placing in the 2015 Fed Cup Europe/Africa Zone Group I. The top two teams advanced to World Group II Play-offs, and the bottom two teams were relegated to the Europe/Africa Zone Group II.

Pool results

Promotional play-offs 
The first placed teams of each pool were drawn in head-to-head rounds. The winner of each round advanced to the World Group II Play-offs.

Serbia vs. Croatia

Belarus vs. Great Britain

5th place play-off
The runner-up teams from pools B and C and those from A and D competed in order to establish which two teams would place joint fifth in the final standings and which two would place joint seventh.

Hungary vs. Belgium

Turkey vs. Georgia

9th place play-off
The third-placed teams of Groups B and C competed to determine the ninth- and tenth-placed teams.

Ukraine vs. Bulgaria

Relegation play-offs 
The teams placing last in each pool competed to keep their place in the Europe/Africa Zone Group I. The bottom-placed team from group A faced the bottom-placed team from Group D, whilst Group B's and Group C's bottom-placed teams faced off. The losers were relegated to the 2016 Europe/Africa Zone Group II.

Austria vs. Latvia

Liechtenstein vs. Portugal

Final placements 

 and  advanced to World Group II play-offs.

References

External links 
 Fed Cup website

2015 Fed Cup Europe/Africa Zone